Andong may refer to:

 Andong, city in Yeongnam, South Korea
 Andong Dam, South Korea
 Dandong, formerly named Andong until 1965, city in Liaoning, China
 Andong Province, a former province of China
 Andong Duhufu, military government established by the Chinese Tang dynasty to rule portions of the Korean Peninsula